The Bangladesh Haor and Wetland Development Board or is a government board that is responsible for the management and regulation of Wetlands and haors in Bangladesh and is located in  Dhaka, Bangladesh.

History
The Government of Bangladesh passed an ordinance which formed the Haor Development Board on 22 February 1977. On 11 September 2000 it was reconstituted to form the Bangladesh Haor and Wetland Development Board by presidential order.

References

2000 establishments in Bangladesh
Organisations based in Dhaka
Government agencies of Bangladesh
Wetland conservation
Water management authorities in Bangladesh